Abaidha ( The demolition Man) is a Bengali film written by Partha Banerjee and Subbir Mukherjee, and directed by Gul Bahar Singh. The film stars Chiranjeet Chakraborty, Debashree Roy, and Rajit Kapur. It was shown in the Montreal film festival and Commonwealth film festival in Manchester in 2002. The film has won the Bengal film journalists' association award for best actor for Chiranjeet Chakraborty. The film has also participated in the 2002 4th Cinemaya festival of Asian Cinema in New Delhi.

Cast
Chiranjeet Chakraborty
Debashree Roy
Rajit Kapur
Sumitra Mukherjee 
Dulal Lahiri 
Monu Mukherjee 
Manjushree 
Chandan Sen

Awards
2003, Best actor award at Bengal Film Journalists' Association Awards.

References

External links

Abaidha (2002) at British Film Institute

Bengali-language Indian films
2000s Bengali-language films
2002 films